Charltons is a village in the borough of Redcar and Cleveland and the ceremonial county of North Yorkshire, England.

The village was named after Thomas Charlton who built the cottages for the miners at his Slapewath ironstone mine around 1870.

References

External links

Villages in North Yorkshire
Places in the Tees Valley
Redcar and Cleveland